The 2002 Northern Illinois Huskies football team represented Northern Illinois University as a member of the West Division of the Mid-American Conference (MAC) during the 2002 NCAA Division I-A football season. Led by seventh-year head coach Joe Novak, the Huskies compiled an overall record of 8–4 with a mark of 7–1 in conference play, sharing the MAC's West Division title with Toledo. By virtue of their head-to-head win over Northern Illinois, the Toledo Rockets advanced to the MAC Championship Game. Despite reaching bowl eligibility, the Huskies were not invited to a bowl game. Northern Illinois played home games at Huskie Stadium in DeKalb, Illinois.

Schedule

Roster

References

Northern Illinois
Northern Illinois Huskies football seasons
Northern Illinois Huskies football